Ernst Dubach (20 January 1881 – 14 January 1982) was a Swiss racing cyclist. He was the Swiss National Road Race champion in 1902.

See also
 List of centenarians (sportspeople)

References

External links
 

1881 births
1982 deaths
Swiss male cyclists
People from Biel/Bienne
Swiss centenarians
Men centenarians
Sportspeople from the canton of Bern